This is the progression of world record improvements of the pole vault M50 division of Masters athletics.

Key

External links
Masters Athletics Pole Vault list

Masters athletics world record progressions
Pole vault